This is a selected list of the longest-running musical theatre productions in history divided into two sections.  The first section lists all Broadway and West End productions of musicals that have exceeded 2,500 performances, in order of greatest number of performances in either market.  The second section lists, in alphabetical order, musicals that have broken historical long run records for musical theatre on Broadway, in the West End or Off-Broadway, since 1866, in alphabetical order.

Legend:
m = music,  l = lyrics, b = book
(Noteworthy trivia appear in parentheses)
(5,678) = number of performances (in original Broadway production if not specified)
> denotes shows that are still in production.  The number of Broadway performances is updated per Playbill.com as of March 2020.  The number of West End performances is updated per Britishtheatre.com as of December 2016, and sporadically as information becomes available.
"Tony Award winner" denotes winner of Tony for Best Musical
"Olivier Award winner" denotes winner of award for Best New Musical

Longest-running musicals on Broadway and the West End 
The following is a list of musical theatre productions that have exceeded 2,500 performances in a single run in a Broadway or West End theatre.

Other historic long runs
The following is an annotated alphabetical list of other musicals that set records for long runs.

Annie Get Your Gun, 1946 Broadway, 1947 London, ml Irving Berlin, b Herbert and Dorothy Fields (1,147: 1,304 in London) (Berlin wrote the songs when Jerome Kern died suddenly)
The Belle of New York 1898, m Gustave Kerker, lb Hugh Morton (697 in London) (After New York run, transferred to London in 1898, where it ran for an almost unprecedented 697 performances and became the first American musical to run for over a year in London.
The Black Crook, 1866, m George Bickwell and others, l by Theodore Kennick and others, and b by Charles M. Barras (474).  This piece is often cited as the first long-running "musical", in that an original book was combined with songs and dancing.  Its 474 performances were a record for the day.
The Boy Friend, 1953 London, 1954 Broadway, mlb Sandy Wilson (2,078 in London; briefly the third longest-running musical in history, after Chu Chin Chow and Oklahoma!, until demoted by Salad Days) (Julie Andrews' American debut)
Carousel, 1945 Broadway, 1950 London, m Richard Rodgers, b Oscar Hammerstein II (899) (the authors' favorite of their musicals) (one of the longest-running Broadway shows up to that time)
The Chimes of Normandy (adapted from the French Les Cloches de Corneville), 1878, m Robert Planquette, lb H. B. Farnie and R. Reece (705) (the longest-running piece of musical theatre in history until Dorothy broke its record in 1886)
A Chinese Honeymoon, 1901, m Howard Talbot and Ivan Caryll, l Harry Greenbank, and lb George Dance (1,075) (The first musical to run for more than 1,000 performances)
Chu Chin Chow, 1916, m Frederic Norton, b Oscar Asche (2,238 in London) (longest-running musical in history from 1916 until Salad Days in 1954, and one of the World War I smash hits that defined the music of the era.  See also The Maid of the Mountains).
Dorothy, 1886, m Alfred Cellier, lb B. C. Stephenson (931) (one of the first "modern" musicals, and the longest-running piece of musical theatre in history until A Chinese Honeymoon in 1901.
The Fantasticks, 1960, m Harvey Schmidt, l Tom Jones (17,162) Longest-running musical in history.
Florodora, 1899, m Leslie Stuart and Paul Rubens, l Edward Boyd-Jones and Rubens, b Owen Hall (552) (second longest-running Broadway musical (after A Trip to Chinatown) until Irene in 1919 pushed it down to third; it was first very successful in London (455 performances) and achieved international success in Europe and elsewhere, including Broadway in 1900.  It was the first instance of a British production achieving such a long initial Broadway run.)
Forbidden Broadway, 1982, m arranged in part and written in part by Gerard Alessandrini, lb Gerard Alessandrini (2,332) (briefly the third longest-running off-broadway production; this spoof of current musicals ran almost continuously from 1982 to 2010 in various versions)
The Geisha, 1896, m Sidney Jones and Lionel Monckton, l Harry Greenbank, b Owen Hall (760 in London) (The second longest-running piece of musical theatre (after Dorothy) until it was edged out by San Toy in 1899.  It was one of a series of highly successful musicals at Daly's Theatre in London.)
Hellzapoppin (revue), 1938, ml Sammy Fain and Charles Tobias, b John "Ole" Olsen and Harold "Chic" Johnson (1,404, the longest-running Broadway musical, until beaten by Oklahoma!  Its opening scene was Hitler speaking in a Yiddish accent, and it included audience participation.)
H.M.S. Pinafore, 1878, m Arthur Sullivan, lb W. S. Gilbert (571 in London) (first G&S smash hit and second longest-running piece of musical theatre in history until it was edged out by Gilbert and Sullivan's Patience in 1881.  One of the most frequently produced pieces of musical theatre in the world)
I Love You, You're Perfect, Now Change, 1996, m Jimmy Roberts, lb Joe DiPietro (5003) (2nd longest-running Off Broadway musical in history)
Irene, 1919, m Harry Tierney, l Joseph McCarthy (lyricist), b James Montgomery (670) (longest-running Broadway show up to that time (though London had already had many longer-running shows ) until Hellzapoppin in 1938)
Little Shop of Horrors, 1982, m Alan Menken, lb Howard Ashman (2,209) (the highest-grossing production in off-Broadway history; revived successfully on Broadway)
The Maid of the Mountains, 1917, m Harold Fraser-Simson, l Harry Graham, b Frederick Lonsdale ((1,352 in London) (second longest-running musical (see Chu Chin Chow) and one of the World War I smash hits that defined the music of the era)
The Mikado, 1885, m Arthur Sullivan, lb W. S. Gilbert (672 in London) (longest-running G&S piece and second longest-running piece of musical theatre in history until Dorothy in 1886.  Probably the most frequently produced piece of musical theatre in the world)
No, No, Nanette, 1925, m Vincent Youmans, l Irving Caesar, lb Otto Harbach, b Frank Mandel (665 London; 321 Broadway, one of the longest-running interwar shows with international success)
Nunsense, 1985, mlb  Dan Goggin (3,672) (2nd longest-running Off-Broadway musical until surpassed by I Love You, You're Perfect, Now Change)
Oklahoma!, 1943 Broadway, 1947 London, m Richard Rodgers, lb Oscar Hammerstein II, (2,212, the longest-running Broadway show in history, until My Fair Lady)
Salad Days, 1954, mlb Julian Slade, l Dorothy Reynolds (2,283 in London, finally breaking the long-held record of Chu Chin Chow for longest-running musical.  It held the record until My Fair Lady)
San Toy, 1899, m Sidney Jones, l Harry Greenbank and Adrian Ross, b Edward Morton (768 in London) (It edged out The Geisha as the second longest-running piece of musical theatre (after Dorothy) and held that record until it was thrashed by A Chinese Honeymoon in 1901.  It was one of a series of highly successful musicals at Daly's Theatre in London.)
The Shop Girl, 1894, m Ivan Caryll and Lionel Monckton, l Adrian Ross, lb H. J. W. Dam (546 in London) (one of the first of the innovative Gaiety Theatre, London musicals produced by George Edwardes in the 1890s)
The Sound of Music, 1959 Broadway, 1961 London, m Richard Rodgers, l Oscar Hammerstein II, b Howard Lindsay and Russel Crouse  (2,385 in London, the second-longest-running musical in West End history at that time, after Oliver!; 1,442 on Broadway) (1960 Tony Award winner) (1965 film became one of the most popular movie musicals)
South Pacific, 1949 Broadway, 1951 London, m Richard Rodgers, lb Oscar Hammerstein II, b Joshua Logan (1,925, the second longest-running Broadway musical up to that time) (1950 Tony Award winner)
The Threepenny Opera, 1954, m Kurt Weill lb Marc Blitzstein (from the German of Bertolt Brecht) (2,707) (longest-running off-Broadway musical until The Fantasticks)
A Trip to Chinatown, 1891, m Percy Gaunt, lb Charles H. Hoyt (657) (first Broadway musical to exceed 500 performances, although London had already had a few longer-running musical theatre pieces.  It held the Broadway record until Irene in 1919)

See also
Lists of musicals
List of the longest-running Broadway shows
List of the longest-running West End shows
Long runs on the London stage, 1700–2020
List of Tony Award and Olivier Award winning musicals
AFI's Greatest Movie Musicals

Notes

References
 Longest-running plays in London and worldwide
 Longest Running Shows in the West End – 2019
 List of longest-running Broadway productions from Playbill.com
 List of longest-running plays in London and New York, 1875 to 1920
 "Musical Stage & Screen Chronologies" at Musicals101.com

External links 
Ganzl, Kurt. The Encyclopedia of Musical Theatre (3 Volumes). New York: Schirmer Books, 2001.
The Broadway Musical Home
The Cyber Encyclopedia of Musical Theatre, TV and Film

Musical theatre
 
Entertainment-related lists of superlatives
Long running
M